The Monastery of St. John the Theologian is  a Greek Orthodox Christian nunnery located in Souroti, Greece. It was founded in 1967.

The tomb of Saint Paisios of Mount Athos is located in the monastery. The relics of Saint Arsenios the Cappadocian are also kept in the monastery.

The monastery has a publishing house that publishes books in both Greek and English.

References

External links

Buildings and structures in Thessaloniki (regional unit)
Greek Orthodox monasteries in Greece